was a district located in Ōita Prefecture, Japan.

As of 2003, the district had an estimated population of 10,956 and the density of 39.58 persons per km2. The total area was 276.84 km2.

Former towns and villages
 Kujū
 Naoiri
 Ogi

District Timeline
 On April 1, 2005 - the towns of Kujū, Naoiri and Ogi were merged into the expanded city of Taketa. Therefore, Naoiri District was dissolved as a result of this merger.

Former districts of Ōita Prefecture